"Heart and Soul" is Japanese band AAA's 23rd single, and the lead single released before their fifth studio album, Heartful. The single was released on January 27, 2010, a month before the album.

Promotion
"Heart and Soul" was given two tie-ups: one as the ending theme song for the TBS Kantō area news show Niusuzansu, as well as being the music.jp TV commercial song. The B-side "Two Roads" (a solo song sung by Mitsuhiro Hidaka) was written by former The Kaleidoscope/Ricken's vocalist Takumi Ishida, and was used as the insert song for the film Sayonara Itsuka.

Chart performance
The song debuted at No. 3 in its first week, selling 33,000 copies. It charted for a total of four weeks, with two more in the top 100 (at No. 30 and No. 87 respectively), before charting at No. 127 and then leaving the top 200. As the single sold a total of 37,000 copies, it was extremely front loaded, selling 90% of copies in its first week.

The song peaked at No. 15 on the Billboard Japan Hot 100, charting for three weeks before the single's release due to low-level airplay. The song peaked at No. 31 on the RIAJ Digital Track Chart and only ranked for a single week in the top 100.

Track listing

Charts

Reported sales

References

External links
Avex Heart and Soul profile 

AAA (band) songs
2010 singles
2010 songs
Avex Trax singles
Songs written by Mitsuhiro Hidaka